Michal Hubník (born 1 June 1983) is a Czech football coach and a former striker. He is the manager of Viktoria Otrokovice. His brother Roman Hubník is also a professional footballer.

Career

Club
In February 2011, his club Sigma Olomouc loaned him for the rest of the season to Legia Warszawa.

International
He played four matches for the Czech Republic national football team.

Honours 
SK Sigma Olomouc
 Czech Supercup: 2012

References

External links
 
 
 Player profile 
 
 

1983 births
Living people
Czech footballers
Czech Republic youth international footballers
Czech Republic under-21 international footballers
Czech Republic international footballers
Czech First League players
SK Sigma Olomouc players
SFC Opava players
FK Jablonec players
Association football forwards
Legia Warsaw players
Ekstraklasa players
Expatriate footballers in Poland
Czech expatriate footballers
FK Drnovice players
Czech football managers